Quinton Friend (born 16 February 1982) is a South African former cricketer. He bowls right arm fast-medium with an action similar to Damien Fleming and is a tail-end right-handed batsman.

Career

Friend, who was born in Bellville, Western Cape, debuted for the Warriors in 2002 in List A cricket, and in 2002 in first class cricket at Pietermaritzburg. He took career best figures of 3/36 against Western Province Boland in a one-day match on 17 November 2004, and the following year in January 2005 he took 5/93 in one day again against Western Province in a first class match, ending with final figures of 6/114. Against Western Province again Friend was the pick of the bowlers with 4/65 on 2 March 2006 during a one-day game,

In 2007, Western Provinces merged with Boland to become the Cape Cobras, who then released Friend on 12 July 2007 to join the Dolphins. He led them to victory against the Titans on 22 October 2007, however eight days later was suspended for one match along with Titans' Martin van Jaarsveld for verbal abuse.

Notes

External links

1982 births
Living people
Cricketers from Bellville, South Africa
South African cricketers
Cape Cobras cricketers
Western Province cricketers
Dolphins cricketers